Côte de la Montagne is a street in the Canadian city of Quebec City, Quebec. It climbs, in a winding fashion, Cap Diamant, connecting the Lower Town to the Upper Town. It begins at Rue Dalhousie in the east and ends at Rue Port Dauphine in the west. Directly opposite its western terminus is the building of the Roman Catholic Archdiocese of Quebec.

Part way up the hill, the Breakneck Stairs, built in the 17th century, connects the pedestrian with the Lower Town at Rue Sous-le-Fort and Rue du Petit-Champlain.

History
In 1620, Samuel de Champlain, the city's founder, built his home at the top of Cap Diamant. He then drew a road, côte de la Montagne, which still follows the same route today.

Gallery

References

External links

Streets in Quebec City
1620 establishments in the British Empire